European route E13 is part of the International E-road network. It runs most of the length of the M1 motorway in the United Kingdom, from South Yorkshire to London.

Although the United Kingdom government participates fully in the E-road network, E-routes are not signposted within the United Kingdom.

References

External links 
 UN Economic Commission for Europe: Overall Map of E-road Network (2007)

13
1-0013
1-0013
1-0013
1-0013
1-0013
1-0013
1-0013
13